Valeria Maria Ayos Bossa (born 20 March 1994) is a Colombian beauty pageant titleholder who was crowned Miss Universe Colombia 2021. She represented Colombia at the Miss Universe 2021 pageant in Israel where she finished as a Top 5 finalist. She was the third Miss Colombian of African descent after Vanessa Mendoza and Andrea Tovar.

As a former beauty queen, she competed in two of the Big Four international beauty pageants with higher placements.

2018: Miss Earth – Water (unoffically equivalent to second runner-up) and;

2021: Top 5 finalist at the 70th Miss Universe.

Early life and education 
Ayos was born in Cartagena and raised in San Andrés Island. Her father is Colombian of Spanish and Italian descent while her mother is Afro-Colombian of Trinidadian descent.

Ayos completed her her elementary in San Andrés Island and her high school education at Instituto Alberto Merani in Bogotá. She earned her bachelor's degree in international relations from the Jorge Tadeo Lozano University in Bogotá, Colombia.

Pageantry

Miss Earth Colombia 2018
On August 23, 2018, Ayos was crowned Miss Earth Colombia 2018 during the pageant final held in General Saulo Gil Ramirez Sendoya Auditorium in Bogotá succeeding Miss Earth Colombia 2017 and Miss Earth Water 2017, Juliana Franco.

Miss Earth 2018
Ayos represented Colombia at the Miss Earth 2018 pageant which was held at MOA Arena, Bay City, Pasay, Metro Manila, the Philippines and finished as Miss Earth - Water 2018 which unofficially equivalent to 2nd Runner-up.

Miss Universe Colombia 2020
Ayos was cast as one of the official candidates for the Miss Universe Colombia 2020 pageant but withdrew the pageant after suffering from partial face paralysis.

Miss Universe Colombia 2021
Ayos represented Cartagena at the Miss Universe Colombia 2021 pageant and won the title succeeding Laura Olascuaga of Bolívar.

Miss Universe 2021
Ayos represented her country at the Miss Universe 2021 pageant held on December 13, 2021 at the Universe Dome (near Port of Eilat) in Eilat, Israel and placed as Top 5 finalist together with Beatrice Gomez of the Philippines.

Personal life
Ayos married her boyfriend Cristhian Lerma Beltrán on 28 January 2023 at Iglesia de San Pedro Claver, Cartagena de Indias. After 12 years of being in relationship.

Filmography

Television

References

External links

 

1994 births
Living people
Colombian beauty pageant winners
Colombian female models
Miss Earth 2018 contestants
Miss Universe 2021 contestants
People from Cartagena, Colombia
Colombian people of Spanish descent
Colombian people of Italian descent
Colombian people of Trinidad and Tobago descent
Afro-Colombian women
Jorge Tadeo Lozano University alumni